Ahmet Şahbaz (born 12 March 1991) is a Turkish footballer who plays as a defender for Fatsa Belediyespor.

Career
He made his Süper Lig debut on 26 January 2014.

References

External links
 
 
 

1991 births
Living people
People from Andırın
Turkish footballers
Sivasspor footballers
Süper Lig players
Association football defenders